Charles Donnachie (1869 – 1923) was a Scottish footballer who played in the Football League for West Bromwich Albion.

References

1869 births
1923 deaths
Scottish footballers
West Bromwich Albion F.C. players
English Football League players
Association football midfielders